The 2017 Japanese Super Cup was held on 18 February 2017 between the 2016 J1 League and 2016 Emperor's Cup champions Kashima Antlers and the 2016 J1 League runners-up Urawa Red Diamonds.

Kashima Antlers won the match 3–2; after Yasushi Endo's brace put Kashima 2–0 up before half-time, Urawa came back in the second half with a penalty scored by Shinzo Koroki and the equalizer by Yuki Muto, but a late winner from Yuma Suzuki proved to be the decisive goal.

Match

Statistics

References

Japanese Super Cup
Super
Kashima Antlers matches
Urawa Red Diamonds matches
Sport in Yokohama